Timnath or Timnah was a Philistine city in Canaan that is mentioned in the Hebrew Bible in  and in connection with Samson. Modern archaeologists identify the ancient site with a tell lying on a flat, alluvial plain, located in the Sorek Valley ca.  north-west of Beit Shemesh, near moshav Tal Shahar in Israel, known in Hebrew as Tel Batash (תל בטש) or Teluliot Batashi (plural), and in Arabic as Tell Butashi or Teleilat Batashi (plural). The site is not to be confused with neither the as yet unidentified Timna from the hill country of Judah, nor with the southern copper-smelting site of Timna in the Arabah near Eilat.

The Tel Batash mound was discovered in the 19th century by C. Clermont-Ganneau, who identified it as a Roman military camp. In subsequent years, the site was uncovered through 1977–1989, in 12 seasons of excavations, by Amihai Mazar and George L. Kelm while Kelm was serving as professor of Biblical backgrounds and archaeology at Southwestern Baptist Theological Seminary, on a dig sponsored by the Seminary.

Geography
Tel Batash is strategically located in the Sorek Valley, an access point from the Coastal Plain through the Shephelah and into the Central Judean Mountains.

Hebrew Bible references
Some think that Judah may have gone to this Timnah (Tibna) to shear his sheep, when he met his daughter-in-law in passing, while others suggest that this would have happened in the Timnath now known in Arabic as Khirbet et-Tibbaneh.

In , a place with this name is mentioned as a point on the border of the Tribe of Judah, and  refers to Timnah's vineyards.

In , Samson went down to Timnah in order to find a wife. On his way there, he tore apart a lion. Samson married a "girl of the Philistines" from Timnah and posed a riddle for the men of Timnah, which they were only able to resolve following the intervention of his wife.

History
Excavations under the leadership of Mazar and Kelm during the 1970s-1980s uncovered twelve strata of continuous settlement at the site through the Hellenistic period, with sparse settlement nearby during the Byzantine period.

Not far from the tell, on the edge of Nahal Sorek (Sorek Valley), are the remains of a Roman road as well as settlement dating to the Chalcolithic and Canaanite periods.

Bronze Age
Tel Batash was first settled in the Middle Bronze Age by creating an earthen rampart that enclosed the 10 acre (4 hectare) site.

Bronze to Iron Age
Tel Batash during the Philistine era (Late Bronze Age to Iron Age) was a fortified city with dense mud-brick construction.

Iron Age
The archaeologists discovered fortifications and buildings from the Kingdom of Judah period, dating to the 7th and 8th centuries BCE. In one of the buildings, a ceramic potsherd bearing a written LMLK seal was found.

Old identification (Khirbet Tibneh)
Khirbet Tibna, also spelled Kh. Tibneh, is a ruin situated ca.  south-west of Bet Shemesh, Israel. Access to the site is now restricted, as it sits in a military area, at an elevation of 225 metres (740 ft) above sea-level. Early explorers and historical geographers identified the ruin Kh. Tibna with the biblical town of Timnah, thought to be associated with stories of the biblical Samson (Judges 14:1-5). French orientalist Clermont-Ganneau also thought Tibna to be a corruption of the Hebrew word Timnah. 

Edward Robinson visited the immediate area in 1838, and Tibna was already a deserted village. Archaeologist W.F. Albright visited the site in the winter of 1924–25, which he described as "Khirbet Tibneh, the Timnath of the Samson story." He wrote that the site was covered with "masses of Græco-Roman and Byzantine débris," although he was unable to come-up with Jewish potsherds. In the 1940s, archaeologist Benjamin Mazar conducted a surface survey in the region - including Tell Butashi, without digging.

Modern identification (Tell Butashi)
Today, modern archaeologists think the biblical Timnath (Timnah) associated with the saga of Samson to have been situated where Tell Butashi is now located and where extensive archaeological excavations had been conducted during the 1970s–1980s. With the town's demise, the name "Timnah" is thought to have migrated to the site now known as Khirbet Tibna, a few kilometers away from Tell Butashi.

References

Other References

External links
 Survey of Western Palestine, 1880 Map, Map 16: IAA, Wikimedia commons Tell Butashi and the region of Timnah, near the Sorek Valley (Wady es Surar)
Hebrew Bible cities
Former populated places in Southwest Asia
Archaeological sites in Israel
Ancient Israel and Judah
Former populated places in Israel
Ancient sites in Israel
Bronze Age sites in Israel
Iron Age sites in Israel
Canaanite cities
Philistine cities
Biblical geography
Kingdom of Judah